Mercy Street was an American period medical drama television series created by Lisa Wolfinger and David Zabel. The series is based on the memoir, Adventures of an Army Nurse in Two Wars, by Mary Phinney von Olnhausen. It is set during the Civil War and follows two volunteer nurses from opposing sides who work at the Mansion House Hospital in Alexandria, Virginia. The first season of six episodes premiered on-demand on January 14, 2016 and made its broadcast debut on January 17, 2016 on PBS with 3.3 million viewers.

PBS announced in early March 2016 that Mercy Street had been renewed for a second season which premiered on January 22, 2017.

On March 9, 2017, PBS cancelled the series after two seasons.

Cast and characters

 McKinley Belcher III as Samuel Diggs
 Suzanne Bertish as Matron Brannan
 Norbert Leo Butz as Dr. Byron Hale
 L. Scott Caldwell as Belinda Gibson
 Gary Cole as James Green, Sr.
 Jack Falahee as Frank Stringfellow
 Peter Gerety as Dr. Alfred Summers
 Shalita Grant as Aurelia Johnson (season 1)
 Hannah James as Emma Green
 Brad Koed as James Green, Jr.
 Luke Macfarlane as Chaplain Henry Hopkins
 Cameron Monaghan as Tom Fairfax (season 1)
 Donna Murphy as Jane Green
 Josh Radnor as Dr. Jed Foster
 AnnaSophia Robb as Alice Green
 Tara Summers as Anne Hastings
 Wade Williams as Silas Bullen
 Mary Elizabeth Winstead as Mary Phinney
 Owen Teague as Otis
 Bryce Pinkham as Major Clayton McBurney
 Patina Miller as Charlotte Jenkins (season 2)
 Brían F. O'Byrne as Allan Pinkerton (season 2)
 William Mark McCullough as Larkin (season 2)
 Brannon Cross as Detective #2 (season 2)

Production
The series was created by Lisa Wolfinger and David Zabel and inspired by memoirs and letters of actual doctors and female nurse volunteers at Mansion House Hospital. The production consulted a number of experts, including James M. McPherson and Dr. Stanley Burns, for historical and medical accuracy. Dr. Burns' The Burns Archive has a collection of photographs of wounded soldiers and operations, which helped inspire the show.

The show was filmed in Richmond and Petersburg, Virginia, largely in the Petersburg Old Town Historic District. Between 250–300 extras were employed for each episode, pulled in equal parts from local theater around the Richmond region, and first timers alike.

Series overview

Episodes

Season 1 (2016)

Season 2 (2017)

Critical reception
The series has received generally positive reviews from critics. On review aggregator Metacritic, it has a score of 61/100, indicating "generally favorable reviews", based on 19 critics. On Rotten Tomatoes, it has an approval rating of 75% based on 20 reviews, with an average rating of 6.7/10, stating "Mercy Street's intriguing setting and talented cast can't compensate for the overall lack of excitement in a period drama that's traditional to a fault".

Mekeisha Madden Toby of TheWrap wrote, "Riveting drama...masterfully made."

See also

 Adventures of an Army Nurse in Two Wars (book)
 Mary Phinney von Olnhausen

References

External links
 
 
 

2010s American drama television series
2016 American television series debuts
2017 American television series endings
English-language television shows
2010s American medical television series
PBS original programming
Television series about the American Civil War
Television series by Scott Free Productions
Television shows set in Virginia
Cultural depictions of Allan Pinkerton